
The following is a list of episodes of Wait Wait... Don't Tell Me!, NPR's news panel game, that aired during 2022.  All episodes, unless otherwise indicated, feature host Peter Sagal and announcer/scorekeeper Bill Kurtis.  Dates indicated are the episodes' original Saturday air dates.  Job titles and backgrounds of the guests reflect their status at the time of their appearance.

Thru the week of June 4, unless otherwise indicated, Wait Wait episodes were produced through the facilities of the show's co-producer, WBEZ/Chicago, with participants joining the show through Zoom links.  From the episode of June 11 onward, also unless otherwise indicated, episodes originated with live audiences from its new regular home, the Studebaker Theatre at Chicago's Fine Arts Building.  (The program had originated from the Chase Auditorium from 2005 until just before the COVID-19 pandemic commenced in early 2020.)

January

February

March

April

May

June

July

August

September

October

November

December

References

External links
Wait Wait... Don't Tell Me! official website
WWDT.me, an unofficial Wait Wait historical site

Wait Wait Don't Tell Me
Wait Wait... Don't Tell Me!
Wait Wait Don't Tell Me